Zawyki  is a village in the administrative district of Gmina Suraż, within Białystok County, Podlaskie Voivodeship, in north-eastern Poland.

According to the 1921 census, the village was inhabited by 427 people, among whom 380 were Roman Catholic, 43 Orthodox, and 4 Mosaic. At the same time, 421 inhabitants declared Polish nationality, 2 Belarusian and 4 Jewish. There were 80 residential buildings in the village.

References

Zawyki
Grodno Governorate
Białystok Voivodeship (1919–1939)
Belastok Region